Cláudia Vasconcelos Guedes (born 30 March 1963) is a Brazilian former football referee. At the 1991 FIFA Women's World Cup she became the first woman to referee a match in FIFA competition.

References

External links
profile at WorldReferee.com

1963 births
Brazilian football referees
Women association football referees
Living people
FIFA Women's World Cup referees